Tsai Pei-shan (born 17 June 1978) is a Taiwanese taekwondo practitioner. She won a bronze medal in welterweight at the 1993 World Taekwondo Championships. She won a silver medal at the 2000 Asian Taekwondo Championships.

References

External links

1978 births 
Living people
Taiwanese female taekwondo practitioners
World Taekwondo Championships medalists
Asian Taekwondo Championships medalists